Prazeres (Portuguese meaning "pleasures") may refer to the following places in Portugal:

Prazeres, Madeira, a parish in the municipality of Calheta, Madeira Islands, Portugal
Prazeres (Lisbon), a parish in the municipality of Lisboa, Portugal